Terry Dennis is a Canadian provincial politician, who is the current Member of the Legislative Assembly of Saskatchewan for the riding of Canora-Pelly. He was first elected in the 2016 provincial election. He is a member of the Saskatchewan Party.

Dennis served as a town councillor and later as mayor of the town of Canora, Saskatchewan, holding the latter position for fourteen years. He was also the co-owner of Dennis' Foods, a grocery store in Canora that had been owned by the Dennis family since 1947. The store was sold in the year 2016. He has been twice convicted of drunk driving, once in 1979 and again in 2001 during his first term as mayor.

Electoral history

2016 Saskatchewan general election

References

Living people
Saskatchewan Party MLAs
Curlers from Saskatchewan
People from Canora, Saskatchewan
Canadian sportsperson-politicians
21st-century Canadian politicians
1961 births